The  is a DC electric multiple unit (EMU) commuter train type operated by the private railway operator Tobu Railway in Japan since 1988.

The 20000 series fleet is scheduled to be replaced by new Tobu 70000 series EMUs with 20 m cars.

Variants
 20000 series: 13 x 8-car sets introduced from March 1988
 20050 series: 8 x 8-car sets introduced from December 1992 with 5-door cars
 20070 series: 3 x 8-car sets introduced from March 1997
20400 series: 4-car sets introduced from 2018 for the Tobu Utsunomiya Line

20000 series
A total of 104 vehicles (13 eight-car sets, numbered 21801 to 21813) were built to replace the ageing 2000 series trains on inter-running services between the Tobu Skytree Line and the Tokyo Metro Hibiya Line in Tokyo, entering service on 25 March 1988. The body design uses a new lightweight corrugated stainless steel construction. These trains use the same AFE (Automatic Field Excite) chopper control as the earlier Tobu 9000 series trains and bolsterless bogies.

Formation
Trains are formed as follows, with six motored ("M") cars and two non-powered driving trailer ("Tc") cars.

The M1 cars are each fitted with one scissors type pantograph.

20050 series

A total of 64 vehicles (8 eight-car sets, numbered 21851 to 21858) were introduced on 29 December 1992 on Tobu Isesaki Line (present-day Tobu Skytree Line) and Tokyo Metro Hibiya Line inter-running services. These sets feature two five-door cars at each end, and also LED destination indicators. These sets have VVVF control.

Formation
Trains are formed as follows, with six motored ("M") cars and two non-powered driving trailer ("Tc") cars.

The M5 and M7 cars are each fitted with one scissors type pantograph.

Interior
Passenger accommodation consists of longitudinal bench seating throughout, with seats for three persons between each pair of doors in the five-door cars. As with the 9050 series EMUs introduced around the same time, these sets featured LCD passenger information screens above the doorways, but these were subsequently removed.

20070 series

These are eight-car sets that were introduced from 25 March 1997 to cope with an increased service frequency, of which 24 vehicles (three eight-car sets, numbered 21871 to 21873) were built. These sets feature three-door cars throughout, and also LED destination indicators. These sets have VVVF control.

Formation
Trains are formed as follows, with six motored ("M") cars and two non-powered driving trailer ("Tc") cars.

The M1 and M3 cars are each fitted with one single-arm pantograph.

Interior
Passenger accommodation consists of longitudinal bench seating throughout. These sets feature three-colour LCD passenger information displays above alternate doorways.

20400 series

The 20400 series are four-car sets for Tobu Nikko Line and Utsunomiya Line operation north of Minami-Kurihashi Station. The first trains entered revenue service on 3 September 2018.

Formation
Trains are formed as follows, with two motored cars and two non-powered trailer cars. Car 1 ("Tc2") and 4 ("Tc1") are former 20000 series cars built by Alna Koki in 1988, and cars 2 ("M2") and 3 ("M1") are former 20070 series cars built by Tokyu Car in 1997. Some sets will incorporate former 20050 series cars, which will be converted from five doors to three doors per side.

The M1 car is fitted with two single-arm pantographs.

Interior
Passenger accommodation consists of longitudinal bench seating throughout. The interior is based on the 70000 series design.

Withdrawal and refurbishment
The 20000 series trains began to be replaced by new 70000 series trains from 7 July 2017. The first sets to be withdrawn, sets 21813 and 21809, were removed for scrapping in July 2017. Some of the 20000 series trains are also refurbished as 20400 series to replace 8000 series trains.

The five-door 20000 series trains are being withdrawn so that platform doors can be installed on Tokyo Metro Hibiya Line stations.

Transferred vehicles
20000 series cars are scheduled to be transferred to Alpico Kotsu for use on the Kamikōchi Line, where they will replace life-expired former Keio 3000 series trains.

References

External links

 Tobu 20000 series 

Electric multiple units of Japan
20000 series
Train-related introductions in 1988
Alna Koki rolling stock
Tokyu Car multiple units
1500 V DC multiple units of Japan